Coffee Road as it became known, was a supply trail cut through the southern Georgia frontier in the early 1820s by General John E. Coffee,
with the help of Thomas Swain. After establishing the counties of Early, Irwin, and Appling in 1819, the Georgia General Assembly approved construction of the road December 23, 1822, with funds of $1,500. The trail was built in the early 1820s and ran from Jacksonville, Georgia, through Metcalf and across the Florida border to Tallahassee.

This became the first vehicular path through the region. The trail was initially built to carry munitions of war to Florida Territory to fight the Indians during the Creek Wars. It was later used by settlers moving into the Georgia frontier. It has no bridges or ditches and only private ferry crossings. Many pioneer families, including Hall, Folsom, Roundtree, Parrish, and Knight, migrated to claim land for farms and plantations. They brought enslaved African Americans or bought them through the domestic slave trade to work the cotton plantations.

Later improved to modern paved standards, much of the road remains in daily use.

See also 

 General Coffee State Park
 Coffee County, Georgia

References

External links 
 
 Old Coffee Road historical marker

Historic trails and roads in Florida
Historic trails and roads in Georgia (U.S. state)